The Hong Kong national netball team represents Hong Kong in international netball tournaments. They compete in the biannual Asian Netball Championship. They are currently ranked 33rd in the world.

2018 National Open Team ANC

Netball in Hong Kong
The senior women's side was previously coached by New Zealand's Robin Manihera, who stepped down in 2019. As of 2020, New Zealander Dion Te Whetu was selected as head coach. Te Whetu will also spearhead the additional high performance netball programs in Hong Kong including the men's side.

In 1994, the 1st Asian Youth Netball Championship were held in Hong Kong. Hong Kong had a national team compete in the fifth Asian Netball Championships held in Colombo, Sri Lanka in 2001. Hong Kong competed in the 7th Asian Youth Netball Championship held in 2010 in India.

References

Bibliography

 
Hong Kong Netball Association (1 September 2018)."Hong Kong Open National Team 2018". https://netball.org.hk/hkopen-national-team-18/

External links 
Olympic Council of Asia

 
Netball
National netball teams of Asia